William Sherwen was Archdeacon of Westmorland from 1901 until his death on 1 March 1915.

He was educated at The Queen's College, Oxford; and was ordained in 1860. He served curacies in Cold Brayfield, Bishopwearmouth, Sedgefield and Dean. He was Rural Dean of Cockermouth and Workington from 1882 to 1901.

Notes

Alumni of The Queen's College, Oxford
Archdeacons of Westmorland
1915 deaths